The Aircraft Carrier (Medium) (CVV) was an American design for a conventional-powered (i.e. non-nuclear-powered) aircraft carrier proposed in the 1970s. It was to be smaller and cheaper than the contemporary nuclear-powered . A single example was planned, but was not built, with further Nimitz-class carriers built instead.

Development and design
In the early 1970s, the United States Navy, following the doctrine of Chief of Naval Operations Admiral Elmo Zumwalt for larger numbers of smaller and cheaper ships, initiated design studies for a "minimum-cost" carrier of 50,000–60,000 tons. The new design was planned to be much cheaper than nuclear-powered carriers (a cost target of $550 million was set in 1972) but still be suitable for replacing the aging s. But work on the project (designated T-CBL) was stopped when the US Congress made statements encouraging all major warships to be nuclear-powered, and in 1976 an order was placed for a fourth nuclear-powered .

Later that year, however, US President Gerald Ford cancelled the order for the fourth Nimitz, stating that instead, two CVVs (medium-sized, conventional-powered carriers which were expected to mainly operate V/STOL aircraft) would be built. The existing T-CBL design formed the basis for the new CVV, this being of the required size, while also capable of operating all existing conventional carrier aircraft (this proved important, as the hoped-for supersonic V/STOL fighters did not come to fruition).

The CVV carried a smaller airgroup than existing supercarriers (i.e. about 60 compared with about 90 for the nuclear-powered Nimitz class or the conventional-powered s) and had two steam catapults rather than four, and three arrestor cables instead of four. While slower than earlier carriers, this was still sufficiently fast to keep up with carrier task forces. Not all of the design features in the CVV were less capable than earlier carriers, however, as the carrier was planned to have improved protection for the ship's magazines and to be protected against under-keel explosions.

The Carter administration from 1977 onwards continued with the CVV program, by now expected to cost $1.5 billion per ship compared to $2.4 billion for a Nimitz, vetoing congressional attempts to vote $2 billion towards construction of a fourth Nimitz, although plans for a second CVV were abandoned.

A fourth Nimitz-class vessel,  was authorized in the FY 81 budget, however, and the election of Ronald Reagan meant that defense budgets were no longer strained, meaning an end to the CVV.

Notes

Citations

References
 
 
 
 

Aircraft carriers of the United States Navy
Cancelled aircraft carriers
Cancelled ships of the United States Navy
Cold War aircraft carriers of the United States
Proposed aircraft carriers